Susan Summerall Wiles (born May 14, 1957) is an American political consultant who currently serves as a senior advisor on Donald Trump's 2024 presidential campaign. Described as "the most powerful Republican you don't know" by The Hill, Wiles was credited with helping to secure Trump's victories in Florida in the 2016 and 2020 presidential elections.

Background and early career 
Born on May 14, 1957, Wiles graduated from the University of Maryland, College Park. Raised in New Jersey, was one of the three children of Pat Summerall, who played for the National Football League (NFL) and later became a sportscaster.

Political 
In 1979, Wiles was hired as an assistant for Representative Jack Kemp, one of Summerall's teammates on the New York Giants. In 1980, she joined Ronald Reagan's 1980 presidential campaign as a campaign scheduler.

In the 1990s, Wiles served as a chief of staff to John Delaney, who was then serving as mayor of Jacksonville. Wiles also worked for U.S. Representative Tillie Fowler. From 2004 to 2009, she advised mayor of Jacksonville John Peyton. 

In the 2010 Florida gubernatorial election, Wiles was credited with helping elect businessman Rick Scott. Considered an "outsider" at the time, Scott had previously had little connections with the Florida Republican Party.

In January 2011, Wiles was hired as campaign manager for former Governor of Utah Jon Huntsman Jr.'s  2012 presidential campaign. While on the Huntsman campaign, she and former Jacksonville Jaguars player Tony Boselli launched a Ponte Vedra Beach-based consulting firm. Wiles ultimately left the campaign in July 2011.

Work for Donald Trump 
In the 2016 presidential election, Wiles ran the Trump campaign's operations in Florida. During the 2018 Florida gubernatorial election, Wiles was reportedly deputized by Trump to help Republican Ron DeSantis's campaign for Governor. However, "rising tensions between the duo" led to her dismissal as a top advisor to DeSantis in 2019. Wiles also runs Tallahassee, Florida-based lobbying firm Ballard Partners.

In March 2021, Wiles was chosen to serve as CEO of Trump's Save America PAC. In April 2021, Politico described Wiles as the "new honcho atop Trumpworld", noting that she would wield authority over former 2020 campaign manager Bill Stepien and key aide Justin R. Clark. 

In August 2022, she was described as effectively Trump's "chief of staff" in the run-up to the 2022 midterm election and his 2024 presidential campaign announcement. Along with businessman Peter Thiel, Wiles was among the individuals in Trump's circle who pushed him to endorse Blake Masters in the 2022 Senate election in Arizona.

Wiles currently serves as a senior advisor on Trump's 2024 presidential campaign. Alongside fellow advisors Brian Jack and Chris LaCivita, Wiles has been described as one of the "top campaign aides" in Trump's inner circle.

Personal life
Susie Wiles was married to Lanny Wiles, a fellow Republican political operative, whom she moved to Jacksonville with in 1985. The couple would later divorce in 2017.

Following Trump's inauguration, her daughter then-30 year old daughter Caroline Wiles was hired by the White House as deputy assistant to the president and director of scheduling. The Washington Post noted that Caroline Wiles had an "unusual background for a senior White House official", noting that her sole educational qualification was an incomplete degree from Flagler College. 

A further investigation revealed that the younger Wiles had legal issues stemming from driving while intoxicated in both 2005 and 2007. Caroline Wiles ultimately left the White House in February 2017 after failing a background check by the Federal Bureau of Investigation.

References

Living people
21st-century American people
American lobbyists
American political consultants
People associated with the 2016 United States presidential election
People associated with the 2020 United States presidential election
Florida Republicans
Year of birth missing (living people)
Donald Trump 2024 presidential campaign
1957 births
Donald Trump 2016 presidential campaign